USS LST-3 was an  of the United States Navy built during World War II. She was transferred to the Royal Navy in December 1944. Like many of her class, she was not named and is properly referred to by her hull designation.

Construction 
LST-3 was laid down on 29 June 1942, at Pittsburgh, Pennsylvania by the Dravo Corporation; launched on 19 September 1942; sponsored by Mrs. A.C. Harlow; and commissioned on 8 February 1943,.

USN service history
LST-3 was assigned to the Mediterranean Theatre and participated in the following operations: the Allied invasion of Sicily in July and August 1943; and the Invasion of southern France from August to September 1944.

Royal Navy service 
LST-3 was decommissioned from the USN on 23 December 1944, in Bizerte, Tunisia, and commissioned into the Royal Navy the next day. She operated in the Mediterranean. She was returned to the United States April 1946, by a Royal Navy crew and turned back over to USN custody 12 May 1946.

Final disposition
LST-3 was struck from the Navy list on 19 June 1946. On 10 September 1947, she was sold to the Boston Metals Co., of Baltimore, Maryland, for scrapping.

Awards
LST-3 earned two battle stars for World War II service.

References

Bibliography

External links

 

 

1942 ships
Ships built in Pittsburgh
LST-1-class tank landing ships of the United States Navy
LST-1-class tank landing ships of the Royal Navy
World War II amphibious warfare vessels of the United States
World War II amphibious warfare vessels of the United Kingdom
Ships built by Dravo Corporation